Lucius Carl Watters (December 19, 1911 – November 5, 1989) was a trumpeter and bandleader of the Yerba Buena Jazz Band. Jazz critic Leonard Feather said, “The Yerba Buena band was perhaps the most vital factor in the reawakening of public interest in traditional jazz on the west coast.”

Career
Watters was born in Santa Cruz, California, United States, on December 19, 1911  and raised in Rio Vista, California. At St. Joseph's military academy in Sacramento, California he belonged to the drum and bugle corps, where he was chosen "most promising bugler." In 1925, he moved with his family to San Francisco, where he started a jazz band. He taught himself how to arrange music and played trumpet on a cruise ship. He studied music at the University of San Francisco with help from a scholarship, but he dropped out of school to pursue a career.

During the 1930s, he went on tour across America with the Carol Lofner big band. While in New Orleans, he became interested in traditional jazz. Back in California, he assembled jam sessions with Bill Dart, Clancy Hayes, Bob Helm, Dick Lammi, Turk Murphy, and Wally Rose. In 1938, he formed a band that included Hayes, Helm, Squire Gersh, Bob Scobey, and Russell Bennett. The band found steady work at Sweet's Ballroom in Oakland, slipping in pieces of traditional New Orleans jazz into the repertoire until Watters was fired.

In 1939, he established the Yerba Buena Jazz Band to revive the New Orleans jazz style of King Oliver. (Yerba Buena was the first name of San Francisco.)

King Oliver in 1923 played “rich polyphony and rocking but relaxed tempo,” without individual solos, also called “collective improvisation.” Lester Koenig, the owner of Good Time Records, described it as "the ensemble style, the contrapuntal weaving of improvised melodic lines by clarinet, trumpet, and trombone, with the ensemble a setting for occasional solo breaks and choruses."

He brought in pianist Forrest Browne, who taught the band music by Jelly Roll Morton. Watters wrote music and arrangements to add to the traditional repertoire. The band performed at the Dawn Club in San Francisco, where it "began a phenomenally successful career as America’s first real revivalist band." It went on hiatus in 1942 when Watters entered the U.S. Navy but reunited at the Dawn Club after World War II. After the Dawn closed in 1947, the band started the club Hambone Kelly's in El Cerrito, California. In 1949 the band performed with visiting musicians Kid Ory, James P. Johnson, and Mutt Carey.

After Hambone Kelly's closed, the band broke up in 1950. By 1950, the band had lost two key players, Bob Scobey and Turk Murphy, who had gone on their own. Watters ended the Yerba Vista Jazz Band. The Rough Guide concludes: “(they) had gone about as far as they could go: the revival had been launched worldwide and they had broadcast and recorded regularly for ten years.”

Watters left music and became a carpenter, cook, and a student of geology.

In 1961, a mineral from California was named wattersite in his honor.

In 1963, he came out of retirement to perform with Murphy at an anti-nuclear protest in California to prevent a nuclear plant from being constructed at Bodega Bay. He recorded an album for Fantasy with Rose, Helm, Bob Mielke, and Barbara Dane called Blues Over Botega. It included the title track and another song named for the San Andreas Fault, which was consistent with his interest in geology.

After this brief return to music, he retired again and in 1959 he was a chef at an institution in Cotati, California.

Lu Watters died on November 5, 1989 in Santa Rosa, California.

Personnel
 Lu Watters – trumpet
 Bob Scobey – trumpet
 Turk Murphy – trombone
 Squire Gersh – tuba
 Dick Lammi – tuba
 Bob Helm – clarinet
 Ellis Horne – clarinet
 Forrest Browne – piano
 Wally Rose – piano
 Russell Bennett - banjo
 Clancy Hayes – banjo
 Harry Mordecai – banjo
 Bill Dart – drums

Discography

Dining its ten year existence, the Yerba Buena Jazz Band recorded for several small labels.

In 1941 And 1942, the band recorded in San Francisco for the young label Jazz Man Records. Four sessions recorded for Jazz Man Records resulted in 19 released 78 rpm sides.

When the band reorganized in 1946 after World War II it recorded for another new label, West Coast Records. The first seven sessions were held on seven consecutive Monday evenings from April 16, 1946 to May 27 in San Francisco's Avalon Ballroom. The sound went by direct telephone line to a nearby recording studio where the masters were cut. West Coast recorded additional Avalon sessions in September the same year and February the next. The nine sessions resulted in 26 released sides on 78s.

During the fall of 1946, ABC radio broadcast a 15-minute show three times a week at 11:45 p.m. from the Dawn Club. A fan recorded selections of these shows for his personal enjoyment. Sixteen songs from these broadcasts were released on a Fairmont Records LP record in 1973. The same fan also recorded a “This is Jazz” August 16, 1947 radio broadcast featuring the band. “This is Jazz” was a 1947 nationally broadcast radio series. Fairmont also released seven numbers from this broadcast on one side of an LP.

The above are all of the recordings of the band with its original front line of Watters, Scobey, and Murphy.

In 1949 and 1950, after Scobey and Murphy had left the band, several recordings were made at Hambone Kelly's for Norman Granz that resulted in 39 sides that were mostly released on Mercury, and later on Clef, Down Home, and Verve.

In January 1952, Good Time Records bought the masters from Jazz Man Records. It also acquired the masters from West Coast Records. The West Coast Records were reissued on three LPs (12001, 12002, and 12003) in 1954. The Jazz Man masters were also reissued on Good Time LP. In the 1990s, Fantasy Records, which then owned the Good Times catalog, acquired the Fairmont radio recordings. In 1993, Fantasy Records released a four-CD, 96 recordings, set of the Good Times' Yerba Buena recordings. It includes all the band's released sides and several unreleased ones through 1947, except for three recording made from the Avalon Ballroom in February 1947.

In 2001, Giants of Jazz, a label based in Italy, released a CD called San Francisco Style: Lu Watters Yerba Buena Jazz Band: Clancy Hays, vocals, containing 20 of the three dozen sides by the band from December 7, 1949 through the last recordings from mid-1950. By December 1949, both Bob Scobey and "Turk" Murphy had left the band.

References

External links
 Time article from 1946
Paige Van Vorst, West Coast Jazz http://www.bobschulzjazz.com/NEWS/WestCoast.html Reprinted from Jazz Beat, Vol. 18, No. 1, 2006 Accessed April 30, 2022
 The complete Lu Watters' discography https://www.jazzdisco.org/lu-watters/discography/ accessed April 30, 2022
SFtradjazz.org
 Hear a broadcast of a live performance by Lu Watters

1911 births
1989 deaths
Jazz musicians from California
Musicians from Santa Cruz, California
20th-century American musicians
20th-century American male musicians
20th-century trumpeters
20th-century American geologists
American jazz bandleaders
American jazz trumpeters
American male trumpeters
Dixieland revivalists
American male jazz musicians
Sonoma State University faculty
Yerba Buena Jazz Band members
Good Time Jazz Records artists